Michèle Marian (born 7 April 1963) is a German actress. She was born in East Berlin, East Germany.

Selected filmography
1978: Bis dass der Tod euch scheidet
1979: Gelb ist nicht nur die Farbe der Sonne
1991: Derrick - Der Tote spielt fast keine Rolle
1991: Peter Strohm und die italienische Oper (TV-Serie)
1992: Derrick - Die Festmenüs des Herrn Borgelt
1992: Der Millionenerbe
1993: Lutz und Hardy
1994: Im Zweifel für...
1993-1996: Wie Pech und Schwefel
1996: Derrick - Frühstückt Babette mit einem Mörder?
1996: Napoleon Fritz
1997: Dr. Stefan Frank – Der Arzt, dem die Frauen vertrauen
1997-1999: Der Havelkaiser
1997-2000: Dr. Sommerfeld – Neues vom Bülowbogen
2000: Ein Fall für zwei - Frühlings Erwachen
2000: Tatort - Totenmesse
2001: The Old Fox - Mord auf Bestellung
2002: The Old Fox - Es war Mord
2002: In aller Freundschaft
2002: Siska - Der Tode im Asphalt
2003: The Old Fox - Todfeinde
2003: Für alle Fälle Stefanie
2003: Im Namen des Herren
2003: The Old Fox - Plötzlich und unerwartet
2004: Siska - Schlangengrube
2004: Unser Charly
2004: Die Rosenheim-Cops
2004: Stubbe – Von Fall zu Fall - Nina
2004: Siska - Im Falle meines Todes
2005: Siska - Dunkler Wahn
2005–2007: Wege zum Glück

External links

Alexander Agency Munich 

1963 births
Living people
People from East Berlin
Actresses from Berlin
German television actresses
20th-century German actresses
21st-century German actresses